The Archies is a fictional American rock band that features in media produced by, and related to, Archie Comics.  They are best remembered for their appearance in the animated TV series The Archie Show. In the context of the series, the band was founded by vocalist/guitarist Archie Andrews, vocalist/bassist Reggie Mantle, vocalist/drummer Forsythe "Jughead" Jones, vocalist/keyboardist Veronica Lodge and vocalist/percussionist Betty Cooper. In the cartoons, Veronica is shown playing a large keyboard instrument styled after the X-66, a then-current top-of-the-line organ made by the Hammond Organ Company.

The music featured in the series was recorded by session musicians, including Ron Dante on lead vocals and Toni Wine on duet and backing vocals. The recordings were released as a series of singles and albums that achieved worldwide chart success. Their most successful song, "Sugar, Sugar", became one of the biggest hits of the bubblegum pop genre that flourished from 1968 to 1973.

In 2020, a new version of the band was introduced in the television series Riverdale, with Kevin Keller replacing Reggie Mantle. However, the band continues to appear with the five original members in the comic books published by Archie Comics.

An Indian feature film adaptation of The Archies directed by Zoya Akhtar is currently in production for Netflix.

History
The Archies first appeared in a comic book, Life with Archie #60 (April 1967). The fictional band was inspired by the success of the 1966 TV series The Monkees; in particular, Don Kirshner, who had managed the initially-fictional band, wanted a musical act that he could fully control: as The Monkees were fictional but still used the real musicians' names, the musicians themselves became increasingly irritated at being micromanaged, leading to a dispute that culminated in Kirshner being fired. To avoid a repeat of the Monkees fiasco while still allowing himself full control, Kirshner commissioned a band based on cartoon characters—if the session musicians tried to rebel or leave, they could be replaced seamlessly. The early stories copied the TV show's fast cuts and action: "there were pages that had no panel-to-panel continuity at all, just pure strings of nonsense, fantasy, fourth-wall breaking, and exasperated commentary from Betty and Veronica." The feature ended in issue #66.

Fictional line-up
The Archies play a variety of contemporary popular music, consistent with the era in which the comic is drawn. Every member sings vocals, with Jughead handling the bass voice on a few tracks. Though their singing voices were soft and appropriate for pop vocals, their speaking voices are much different. The roles the teens played in the fictional band were:

 Archie Andrews – guitars, vocals
 Reggie Mantle – bass
 Forsythe "Jughead" Jones – drums
 Betty Cooper – vocals, percussion
 Veronica Lodge – keyboards, vocals
 Kevin Keller – keyboards, vocals (Riverdale)

One distribution mode for the Archies' music was embossing cardboard records directly onto the back of cereal boxes, which were cut out and played on a turntable (although their music was also available on standard issue LPs and 45s).

Though the group no longer appears in animation, they are still frequently used in stories published by Archie Comics. In 2020, the group made its second live action appearance on Riverdale, with Kevin Keller replacing Reggie Mantle. In this incarnation Kevin plays keyboard and Veronica sings only.

Production
A set of studio musicians was assembled by Don Kirshner in 1968 to perform various songs. The most famous is "Sugar, Sugar", written by Jeff Barry and Andy Kim, which went to number one on the pop chart in 1969, sold over six million copies, and was awarded a gold disc. In the Billboard Hot 100, it was ranked as the No. 1 song of that year, the only time a fictional band has ever claimed Billboards annual Hot 100 top spot. Other Top 40 songs recorded by the Archies include "Who's Your Baby?" (U.S. No. 40), "Bang-Shang-A-Lang" (U.S. No. 22), and "Jingle Jangle" (U.S. No. 10). "Jingle Jangle" also sold over one million copies, garnering a second gold disc award.

Male vocals for the fictional Archies group were provided by The Cuff Links' lead singer Ron Dante and female duet vocals were provided by Toni Wine. Wine, who was only paid for the recording session and quit the group when the song became a huge hit, was succeeded in 1970 by Donna Marie, who in turn was replaced on the final recordings by Merle Miller. The only Archies song not to feature Ron Dante on lead was 1971's "Love Is Living In You", sung by Bob Levine (co-author of the song) and produced by Ritchie Adams. The last single, released 1972, was "Strangers in the Morning"; its B-side song was "Plum Crazy".

Jeff Barry, Andy Kim, Ellie Greenwich, Susan Morse, Ritchie Adams, Maeretha Stewart, Bobby Bloom and Lesley Miller, contributed background vocals at various times, with Barry contributing his trademark bass voice (portrayed as being sung by Jughead in the cartoon) on cuts such as "Jingle Jangle", "Rock 'n' Roll Music", "A Summer Prayer For Peace" (which hit number one in South Africa and Scandinavia in 1971), and "You Little Angel, You". Musicians on Archies' records included guitarists Hugh McCracken and Dave Appell, bassists Chuck Rainey and Joey Macho, keyboard player Ron Frangipane, and drummers Buddy Saltzman and Gary Chester.

The Archies' records were initially released on the Calendar Records label, but the name was shortly thereafter changed to Kirshner Records.

The sound engineer was Fred Weinberg, who was Jeff Barry's and Andy Kim's favorite, and who also recorded Barry's other hits "Be My Baby", "Baby, I Love You", and Kim's "Rock Me Gently". Fred Weinberg is a composer and producer in his own right. However, the music for The U.S. of Archie which aired in 1974, was produced by Jackie Mills, a Hollywood producer, who also produced Bobby Sherman and the Brady Kids. The vocalist for these shows was Tom McKenzie, who also sang on some Groovie Goolies segments, and was a regular member of the popular singing group, Doodletown Pipers.

Some of the group songs have appeared on episodes of The CW televisions series Riverdale. The group made its debut in Riverdale, in the musical episode "Chapter Seventy-Four: Wicked Little Town", for only the second time in an live action adaptation after the television film Archie: To Riverdale and Back Again in 1990. It includes KJ Apa as Archie, Cole Sprouse as Jughead, Lili Reinhart as Betty, Camila Mendes as Veronica and Casey Cott as Kevin Keller. For the first time, Kevin Keller is part of the group, replacing Reggie Mantle (played by Charles Melton). Kevin sings and plays keyboard. The song "Midnight Radio" is appeared in the series' musical episode soundtrack released by WaterTower Music, on April 15, 2020.

Discography

 The Archies (1968)
 Everything's Archie (1969)
 Jingle Jangle (1969)
 Sunshine (1970)
 The Archies Greatest Hits (1970)
 This Is Love (1971)
 The Archies Christmas Album (2008)

Live-action adaptation 

On November 10, 2021, Netflix announced the Indian feature film adaptation of The Archies. The film will be produced by Tiger Baby Films and Graphic India with Zoya Akhtar as director, starring Agastya Nanda, Suhana Khan, Khushi Kapoor as Archie Andrews, Veronica and Betty respectively alongside others. Filming started on April 18, 2022, and then ended on December 19, 2022.

References

External links
 The Archies

1968 establishments in New York City
Animated musical groups
Archie Comics characters
Fictional musical groups
Musical groups established in 1968
Musical groups disestablished in 1973
Musical groups reestablished in 2008
Musical groups reestablished in 2020
Bubblegum pop groups